Sorbus austriaca is a species of whitebeam. Its berries, which are a pome fruit, are inedible to humans but attract birds. It is also grown as an ornamental plant.

External links
 Sorbus austriaca info

austriaca
Plants described in 1901